The Little Red Schoolhouse is a 1923 American silent drama film directed by John G. Adolfi and starring Martha Mansfield, Harlan Knight and Sheldon Lewis.

Cast
 Martha Mansfield as Mercy Brent 
 Harlan Knight as Jeb Russell 
 Sheldon Lewis as Mr. Matt Russell 
 E.K. Lincoln as John Hale 
 Edmund Breese as Brent 
 Florida Kingsley as Hired Girl 
 Paul Everton as Detective

References

Bibliography
 Munden, Kenneth White. The American Film Institute Catalog of Motion Pictures Produced in the United States, Part 1. University of California Press, 1997.

External links

1923 films
1923 drama films
Silent American drama films
Films directed by John G. Adolfi
American silent feature films
1920s English-language films
American black-and-white films
Arrow Film Corporation films
1920s American films